Mount Cooke, near the Western Australia town of Jarrahdale, is one of the highest points on the Darling Scarp, at .  It was named after William Ernest Cooke, Western Australia's first Government Astronomer.

Mount Cooke is well known for its walk track, which is part of the Bibbulmun Track. The Bibbulmun Track leads from a parking and picnic area, and goes thousands of metres through the jarrah forest, coloured with a host of wildflowers in all seasons, to the summit of Mount Cooke.

Mount Cooke is within the Monadnocks Conservation Park and administered by the Department of Environment and Conservation.

See also
Mount Dale
Mount Gunjin, Western Australia

References

Cooke
Shire of Boddington
Darling Range